The Dreifelder Weiher (also known as: Seeweiher) is a small lake in the northeastern part of the German federal state of Rhineland-Palatinate, which is part of the low mountain range of the Westerwald. It is one of the seven lakes of the Westerwald Lakes. With an area of 123 hectares, it is the largest pond of the Westerwald Lake District.

The surface of the pond is located 410 metres above sea level.

Ponds of Rhineland-Palatinate
Lakes of the Westerwald
Rhineland
Protected landscapes in Germany